In enzymology, a dephospho-CoA kinase is an enzyme that catalyzes the chemical reaction

ATP + dephospho-CoA  ADP + CoA

Thus, the two substrates of this enzyme are ATP and dephospho-CoA, whereas its two products are ADP and CoA.

This enzyme belongs to the family of transferases, specifically those transferring phosphorus-containing groups (phosphotransferases) with an alcohol group as acceptor.  The systematic name of this enzyme class is ATP:dephospho-CoA 3'-phosphotransferase. Other names in common use include dephosphocoenzyme A kinase (phosphorylating), 3'-dephospho-CoA kinase, and dephosphocoenzyme A kinase.  This enzyme participates in pantothenate and coa biosynthesis.

Structural studies

References

 
 
 

EC 2.7.1
Enzymes of known structure